Gary Thompson Gillespie (born 5 July 1960) is a Scottish former professional football defender who played for Falkirk, Coventry City, Liverpool, Celtic and the Scotland national team.

Playing career

Falkirk
Gillespie started his career with Falkirk, and captained them at 17 years of age which set a Scottish record.

Coventry City

Coventry City signed Gillespie in 1978 for an initial transfer fee of £40,000, rising to £75,000 on appearances.

Liverpool

Gillespie signed for Liverpool in 1983.

His three goals in that double winning season all came in the same game. Hat-tricks are rare for defenders, but Gillespie managed one against Birmingham City on 26 April 1986 at Anfield when he scored twice from open play and completed the threesome with a penalty, after the Liverpool fans chanted his name when it was awarded – normally he would not have taken it. Liverpool won the game 5–0 against an already relegated side, as they moved closer to the title, which was sealed on the final day of the season with a 1–0 win at Chelsea.

By 1988, when he partnered Alan Hansen in all but five of Liverpool's games in the league, the Anfield club were a cut above every other side, losing just twice and coasting to the title. In April 1989, Gillespie joined his teammates in mourning the deaths of Liverpool fans at the Hillsborough disaster, during a year in which he again was a regular feature in the team. This time fortunes were reversed – Liverpool won the FA Cup with an emotional victory over fierce Merseyside rivals Everton, but lost the League title to Arsenal with almost the last kick of the season. Gillespie missed that game, however.

In 1990–91, with the absence and eventual retirement of Hansen due to injury, Gillespie was once again a regular in the centre of the Liverpool defence. He played 30 league games and scored once, remaining a regular player even after the resignation of Kenny Dalglish in February 1991 and the arrival of Graeme Souness as manager.

Celtic
The arrival of Mark Wright at Liverpool during the close season made it clear that Gillespie would no longer be considered a first choice defender, and he was transferred to Scottish club Celtic for £925,000 on 15 August 1991. He was among manager Liam Brady's first signings for the Bhoys, who were being left behind by local rivals Rangers who had been champions for the previous three seasons.

His debut for the Glasgow club came on 17 August 1991, in a 4–1 league win over his former side Falkirk at Parkhead. Gillespie also managed to find the back of the net. He made 69 league appearances for the Parkhead club over three years, scoring twice, but failed to pick up any silverware. His performance was disappointing and he was not considered a good investment by Celtic's fans.

Return to Coventry City and retirement
Soon after the appointment of Tommy Burns as Celtic manager in 1994, it became apparent that Gillespie was not part of the new manager's plans. On 23 August 1994 he returned to Coventry City on a free transfer, making three Premier League appearances during the 1994–95 season. However, he played just three FA Premier League games before a knee injury struck him down, and he finally retired from playing in 1997 after more than two years out of action.

International
Gillespie won 13 caps for Scotland. Andy Roxburgh gave him his debut on 14 October 1987 in the 2–0 UEFA European Championship qualifier victory over Belgium at Hampden Park. He was selected for the squad that went to the 1990 FIFA World Cup in Italy, but his only appearance came on 20 June against Brazil at the Stadio delle Alpi Turin, a game the Scots lost 1–0. They failed to progress past the group stages.

Honours
Liverpool
Football League First Division: 1985–86, 1987–88, 1989–90
FA Cup: 1985–86
FA Charity Shield: 1986 (shared), 1988, 1990
 Football League Super Cup: 1986
European Cup: 1983–84

Individual
PFA Team of the Year: 1987–88 First Division

References

External links

Profile at LFCHistory.net

Coventry City seasonal record (part 1) 1977/78-1980/81 at sporting-heroes.net
Coventry City seasonal record (part 2) 1981/82-1982/83 at sporting-heroes.net
Liverpool seasonal record (part 1)  1983/84-1986/87 at sporting-heroes.net
Liverpool seasonal record (part 2)  1987/88-1990/91 at sporting-heroes.net
Celtic seasonal record 1991/92-1993/94 at sporting-heroes.net
Coventry City seasonal record (part 3) 1994/95 at sporting-heroes.net

1960 births
Living people
Scottish footballers
Celtic F.C. players
Coventry City F.C. players
Falkirk F.C. players
Liverpool F.C. players
1990 FIFA World Cup players
Association football central defenders
Scotland international footballers
Premier League players
English Football League players
Footballers from Stirling
Scotland under-21 international footballers
Scottish Football League players
FA Cup Final players
People educated at Graeme High School